INS Beas was a  of the Indian Navy. She was launched by Vickers-Armstrong Ltd at Newcastle upon Tyne in 1958 and completed in 1960. Beas served in the Battle at Mormugão harbour 1961 and during the Indo-Pakistani War of 1971. She was stricken by the INS in 1988 and scrapped in 1992.

Construction and design

She carried pennant number F137, in 1980s changed to F37.

Service

1971 war
Beas took part in amphibious landings at Cox's Bazar alongside her sister ship , landing divers in advance of the landing and providing gunfire support to the landings.

References

1958 ships
Leopard-class frigates